In enzymology, a pantoate 4-dehydrogenase is an enzyme that catalyzes the chemical reaction

(R)-pantoate + NAD+  (R)-4-dehydropantoate + NADH + H+

Thus, the two substrates of this enzyme are (R)-pantoate and NAD+, whereas its 3 products are (R)-4-dehydropantoate, NADH, and H+.

This enzyme belongs to the family of oxidoreductases, specifically those acting on the CH-OH group of donor with NAD+ or NADP+ as acceptor. The systematic name of this enzyme class is (R)-pantoate:NAD+ 4-oxidoreductase. Other names in common use include pantoate dehydrogenase, pantothenase, and D-pantoate:NAD+ 4-oxidoreductase. This enzyme participates in pantothenate and coa biosynthesis.

References

 

EC 1.1.1
NADH-dependent enzymes
Enzymes of unknown structure